Arthur Frank Furze (1903–1982) was a male athlete who competed for England.

Athletics career
Furze won a bronze medal in the 6 miles at the 1934 British Empire Games in London. At the 1931 Workers' Olympiad in Vienna Furze finished second in the 5,000 and 10,000 meter races.

References

1903 births
1982 deaths
English male long-distance runners
Athletes (track and field) at the 1934 British Empire Games
Commonwealth Games medallists in athletics
Commonwealth Games bronze medallists for England
Medallists at the 1934 British Empire Games